The 2014–15 season are the Persepolis's 14th season in the Pro League, and their 32nd consecutive season in the top division of Iranian Football. They were also be competing in the Hazfi Cup & AFC Champions League.  Persepolis is captained by Mohammad Nouri.

Key events
 22 May: The Club signed two-years contracts with two strikers. Mehdi Daghagheleh who scored 11 times in 2013–14 Iran Pro League signed from Malavan & Mehdi Taremi top scorer of 2013–14 Azadegan League with 12 goals from Iranjavan. Both of them joined club with free transfer fee.
 24 May: Mohsen Bengar signed contract extension. 
 1 June: Jalal Hosseini, Hossein Mahini, Mehrdad Pouladi & Reza Haghighi chosen by Carlos Queiroz to taking part in 2014 FIFA World Cup.
 8 June: The Club signed two-years contract with Goalkeeper. Sosha Makani who  clean sheets 13 times in 2013–14 Iran Pro League signed from Foolad. joined club with free transfer fee.
 10 June: The Club signed one-years contract with Forward. Reza Norouzi who scored 11 times in 2013–14 Iran Pro League signed from Naft Tehran. joined club with free transfer fee.
 13 June: The Club signed three-years contract with Midfielder. Ahmad Nourollahi who scored 3 times in 2013–14 Azadegan League signed from Foolad Yazd. Nourollahi is the vice-captain in Iran U–23 after Alireza Jahanbakhsh.
 3 July: Nilson Corrêa signed contract extension another one-years.
 9 July: The Club signed three-years contract with 4 new talents. Nader Safarzaei, Navid Sabouri, Ali Astani, Ali Fatemi joined The Club after success in technical test. 
 17 August: The Club signed two-years contract with Defender. Michael Umaña playing for Costa Rica at the 2006 FIFA World Cup, 2014 FIFA World Cup joined club with free transfer fee.
 10 September: Alireza Rahimi, Ali Daei & his staff sacked by club board of directions. Former Persepolis captain and coach, Hamid Derakhshan, assigned as new head coach while club deputy chairman, Behrouz Montaghami named as new chairman. Hossein Abdi, Alireza Emamifar and Nader Bagheri also assigned as club technical staff.
 17 September: FFIRI disciplinary committee sentenced about Mehrdad Pouladi's contract with Persepolis for 2014–15 season. According to this sentence, contracted canceled after 2013–14 season ends (in May 2014), So Mehrdad Pouladi named as Free agent and free to choose his club.

Squad

First team squad

Loan list

For recent transfers, see List of Iranian football transfers summer 2014 & List of Iranian football transfers winter 2014–15. 
For more on the reserve and academy squads, see Persepolis Novin, Persepolis Academy, Persepolis Shomal & Persepolis Qaem Shahr.

New Contracts

Transfers

In

Out

Technical staff

Ivanković's staff

|}

Derakhshan's staff

|}

Daei's staff

|}

Competitions

Overview

Persian Gulf Pro League

Standings

Results summary

Results by round

Matches

Hazfi Cup

AFC Champions League

Group stage

Knock-out stage

Round of 16

Friendly Matches

Pre-season

During season

Statistics

Appearances and goals

Disciplinary record

Bookings & sendings-off

Suspensions

1 Hossein Mahini signed contract with Malavan late in October, his suspension counted until his official move to Malavan.
2 FFIRI disciplinary committee suspend him for 3 months but FFIRI appeals committee reduce one month of his suspension.
3 After Persepolis elimination in Hazfi Cup Michael Umaña's suspension (due sent off in match against Zob Ahan) applied in League.

Injuries During The Season 
Players in bold are still out from their injuries.

Notes
DM Substituted during match.
R Player released by The Club during his injury time.

Captaincy

Overall statistics

Club

Kit 

|
|

Sponsorship 

Main sponsor: Behnam Pishro Kish
Official sponsor: Iran Zamin Bank
Official shirt manufacturer: Macron 

Official sponsor: EJS International Investment Co.
Official water: Damavand Mineral Water Co.

See also
 2014–15 Iran Pro League
 2014–15 Hazfi Cup
 2015 AFC Champions League

References

External links
Iran Premier League Statistics
Persian League
Persepolis News

Persepolis F.C. seasons
Persepolis